The 2008 Pepsi 500 was the twenty-fifth race of the 2008 NASCAR Sprint Cup season and the next-to-last race to determine the twelve drivers to compete in the 2008 Chase for the Sprint Cup.  The  race was held on Sunday night, August 31 at Auto Club Speedway in Fontana, California. ESPN carried the race beginning at 7 PM US EDT and MRN along with Sirius Satellite Radio having radio coverage starting at 7:15 PM US EDT.  This year marked the final time that this race would be run on Labor Day Weekend.  In 2009, this race will move into the current spot occupied to Talladega Superspeedway as part of the NASCAR 2009 realignment.

Pre-Race News
Jeff Burton joined the NASCAR 500 Start club this week.
In this week's edition of "The Worst Kept Secret in NASCAR", Joe Gibbs Racing officially announced August 25 that Joey Logano will officially take the place of the soon-to-be-departing Tony Stewart in the #20 Toyota for the 2009 season. Logano will debut in the series next week at Richmond driving the #02 car. 
Reed Sorenson will leave Chip Ganassi Racing and the #41 Dodge and become a driver for Gillett Evernham Motorsports in 2009.  His car number and sponsors will be announced at a later date.

Qualifying
Jimmie Johnson took the top position for the fourth time this season and 17th in his career, and A. J. Allmendinger closed fast to take the other front row spot, edging Johnson's Hendrick teammate, Jeff Gordon.

Failed to qualify: Tony Raines (#70).

Race

A caution came out early in the race due to debris when one of the track's caution lights fell onto the track itself. Another caution came out on lap 43 when Kurt Busch spun due to tire tread separation on his left rear tire. The fourth caution came out when Joe Nemechek over corrected  for over steer and hit the wall.  The fifth caution came out around lap 102 due to debris on the track. The sixth caution on 160 was also due debris that was from a small piece of another caution light falling on the track. The seventh caution came out with 70 laps to go due to Robby Gordon spinning out. The eighth caution came out due to Marcos Ambrose's car hitting a wall, after which Jimmie Johnson won the race, leading 228 of 250 laps. Three drivers - Johnson, Dale Earnhardt Jr. and Jeff Burton - all locked up spots in the 2008 Chase for the Sprint Cup.  Greg Biffle, who finished second, also all but wrapped up a spot in the Chase as well, and all he'll have to do is qualify his car and start in Richmond next week.

Polesitter Johnson dominated, leading 238 out of 250 laps to score his 36th victory at the venue where he scored his first just more than six years prior.

Results

References

Pepsi 500
Pepsi 500
NASCAR races at Auto Club Speedway